Tadashi Shimijima (born 8 October 1912, date of death unknown) was a Japanese rower. He competed in the men's eight event at the 1936 Summer Olympics.

References

External links
 

1912 births
Year of death missing
Japanese male rowers
Olympic rowers of Japan
Rowers at the 1936 Summer Olympics
Place of birth missing